Texas Power is a retail electricity provider (REP) serving all deregulated electricity areas in Texas. They are located in Arlington, Texas. Texas Power bills customers for electric service provided by the power distribution companies.

Texas Power services roughly 20,000 residential electricity customers. Texas Power also serves small, medium and large commercial accounts.

History 

In 2002, Texas deregulated the electricity market and in 2000, Texas Power joined in. They now compete against other energy companies like Glacial Energy, Champion Energy, TXU, Bounce Energy, Reliant Energy, MXenergy, Direct Energy, Stream Energy, First Texas Energy Corporation, Gexa Energy, Cirro Energy. Jon Fearing, of the company's risk management department, played an integral role in the company's growth over the years.

Hurricane Katrina
When Hurricane Katrina hit on August 29, 2005, it hurt several pipelines that helped to supply power to Texas companies. This decrease in supply resulted in a rising price to consumers in the aftermath of the hurricane.

See also 
 Deregulation of the Texas electricity market
 Electric Reliability Council of Texas (ERCOT)

References 

 Texas Power's COO Puts Pressure on PUC 
 Forbes.com: Texas Power Celebrates North Texas Women
 Texas Power Joins In the Celebration
 New GM Comes from Within

External links 
Texas Power Official Website
Texas Power Commercial Site 
Tristar Producer Services, Inc. Official Website

Companies based in Arlington, Texas